Lasikin Airport  is an airport in Sinabang, Simeulue island, Aceh, Indonesia. The airport was damaged by the 2004 tsunami and destroyed by the 2005 Nias–Simeulue earthquake. It was reopened on 1 November 2007 following 45 billion rupiah of spending by the Aceh-Nias recovery agency with control tower and enlarged runway facilitating larger turboprop aircraft (Fokker 50).

Airlines and destinations

The following destinations are served from this Airport:

References

Airports in Aceh